This is a season-by-season list of records compiled by Boston University in men's ice hockey.

Boston University has won five NCAA Men's Division I Ice Hockey Championships in its history, the most recent of which coming in 2009. After two early attempts there has been an official ice hockey team at BU since 1922 with a short hiatus caused by World War II. After the war the program played as a club team for four years before returning to varsity status and promptly made the championship game in 1950. despite good performances most years the Terriers didn't win their first title until 1971. Boston University's most productive period was the 1970s and saw them win 4 conference titles, 5 conference tournament titles and 3 national championships. The same decade also brought about the beginning of the longest tenure for one coach at any division I school when Jack Parker started a 40-year stint in 1973–74. After a mostly down period in the 1980s BU had a resurgence in the '90's, winning five consecutive Hockey East titles and appearing in four national championship games (though they could only win one of them).

Season-by-season results

Note: GP = Games played, W = Wins, L = Losses, T = Ties

* Winning percentage is used when conference schedules are unbalanced.† BU was forced to forfeit 11 games after the season for using an ineligible player.‡ Leon Abbot was fired 6 games into the season and replaced by Jack Parker.^ Maine was forced to forfeit 13 games after the season for using an ineligible player.bold and italic are program records

Footnotes

References

 
Lists of college men's ice hockey seasons in the United States
Boston University Terriers ice hockey seasons